Ouvrage Einseling is a lesser work (petit ouvrage) of the Maginot Line.  Located in the Fortified Sector of Faulquemont, the ouvrage consists of one infantry block (béton armé), and is located between petits ouvrages Bambesch and Laudrefang, facing Germany. Einseling faced a determined German attack on 21 June 1940, during the Battle of France.  Unlike its less fortunate neighbors to the west, Einseling was able to resist the attack with help from Laudrefang, its neighbor to the east. The ouvrage survives in a heavily battered state, with its lower levels flooded.

Design and construction 
The site was surveyed by CORF (Commission d'Organisation des Régions Fortifiées), the Maginot Line's design and construction agency, and was approved for construction in April 1932. It was completed at a cost of 7 million francs by the contractor Borie of Paris. The petit ouvrage was planned for construction in two phases. The second phase was to add an 81mm mortar turret block and a separate entrance block.

Description 
Einseling is built as a single infantry block. The casemate-like ouvrage is armed with two automatic rifle cloches (GFM), two machine gun cloches (JM), one retractable machine gun turret, and one machine gun/anti-tank gun embrasure (JM/AC47).

Work for the unbuilt second phase included a separate entry blocks and an 81mm mortar turret block.

Casemates and shelters 
In addition to the connected combat blocks, a series of detached casemates and infantry shelters surround Bambesch, including
 Casemate d'Einseling Nord: Armored block with one 81mm mortar, one GFM-A and one GFM-A/B cloche.
 Casemate d'Einseling Sud: Armored block with one 81mm mortar and two GFM cloches.

The two casemates flank the main block a few hundred meters to either side. A project to link the casemates to the central block was never started.

 Casemate de Stocken: Artillery casemate with two 75mm guns and one GFM cloche, located well to the rear.

Manning 
The 1940 manning of the ouvrage under the command of Lieutenant Vaillant comprised 68 men and 1 officer of the 156th Fortress Infantry Regiment. The units were under the umbrella of both the 3rd and 4th Armies, Army Group 2. The Casernement de Zimming provided peacetime above-ground barracks and support services to Kerfent and other positions in the area.

History 
See Fortified Sector of Faulquemont for a broader discussion of the Faulquemont sector of the Maginot Line.

Following the 15 June 1940 breakthrough by German forces through the Saar gap, the Germans advanced along the rear of the Maginot Line.  The German 167th Infantry Division approached Kerfent, Bambesch, Einseling and Téting on 19 June. On the 20th the Germans successfully assaulted Bambesch, which was not within the reach of heavy French artillery.  The following day the Wehrmacht attacked Einseling, which was more fortunate, as it was within range of Laudrefang's 81mm mortars. Laudrefang's fire, along with accurate fire from Einseling's lighter weapons, broke up a German artillery attack. The ouvrage survived until the Second Armistice at Compiègne took effect on 25 June, when it surrendered.
After World War II, Einseling was in poor condition and was not chosen for renovation.

The surface of the ouvrage has been cleaned up by local residents and may be visited. The lower levels are flooded with water.

See also 
 List of all works on Maginot Line
 Siegfried Line
 Atlantic Wall
 Czechoslovak border fortifications

Notes

References

Bibliography 
Allcorn, William. The Maginot Line 1928-45. Oxford: Osprey Publishing, 2003. 
Kaufmann, J.E. and Kaufmann, H.W. Fortress France: The Maginot Line and French Defenses in World War II, Stackpole Books, 2006. 
Kaufmann, J.E., Kaufmann, H.W., Jancovič-Potočnik, A. and Lang, P. The Maginot Line: History and Guide, Pen and Sword, 2011. 
Mary, Jean-Yves; Hohnadel, Alain; Sicard, Jacques. Hommes et Ouvrages de la Ligne Maginot, Tome 1. Paris, Histoire & Collections, 2001.  
Mary, Jean-Yves; Hohnadel, Alain; Sicard, Jacques. Hommes et Ouvrages de la Ligne Maginot, Tome 2. Paris, Histoire & Collections, 2003.  
Mary, Jean-Yves; Hohnadel, Alain; Sicard, Jacques. Hommes et Ouvrages de la Ligne Maginot, Tome 3. Paris, Histoire & Collections, 2003.  
Mary, Jean-Yves; Hohnadel, Alain; Sicard, Jacques. Hommes et Ouvrages de la Ligne Maginot, Tome 5. Paris, Histoire & Collections, 2009.

External links
 Article on Einseling at Cahiers du Pays Naborien 
 Einseling at wikimaginot.eu 

EINS
Maginot Line
World War II museums in France